The 2014 Judo Grand Slam Paris was held in Paris, France, from 8 to 9 February 2014.

Medal summary

Men's events

Women's events

Source Results

Medal table

References

External links
 

2014 IJF World Tour
2014 Judo Grand Slam
Judo
Grand Slam Paris 2014
Judo
Judo